Gavin Earl Edwards (born January 15, 1988 in Gilbert, Arizona) is a U.S.-born Japanese professional basketball player for Chiba Jets Funabashi in Japan. He is also a member of the Japanese men's national basketball team and competed for them in the 2020 Summer Olympics held in Tokyo.

College 
Edwards played collegiate basketball at UConn Huskies men's basketball.

Professional and National Team career 
Edwards plays professional basketball in Japan in the B.League, and as a naturalized import for the Japanese national team. “It’s not exactly how you’d picture going because you always think, ‘I’d love to play on Team USA,’ but everybody wants to play in the Olympics,” said Edwards, who played at UConn in 2006-10 and has played professionally in Japan for the past eight years." He was one of the last members to be selected.

Career statistics 

|-
| align="left" |  2013–14
| align="left" | Aisin
| 53|| 12|| 23.6|| 60.7|| 50.0|| 64.7|| 8.1|| 1.0|| 0.5|| 1.8||  13.9 
|-
| align="left" |  2014–15
| align="left" | Aisin
| 54||5 || 22.9|| 63.8|| 20.0|| 66.0|| 7.9|| 1.3|| 0.8|| 1.9||  13.8
|-
| align="left" |  2015–16
| align="left" | Aisin
| 53||13|| 25.3|| 57.8|| 36.4|| 71.6|| 7.8|| 1.4|| 0.8|| 1.8||  15.0 
|-
| align="left" | 2016–17
| align="left" | Mikawa
| 60 || 16 || 26.0 || 54.5 || 29.2 || 68.8 || 7.5 || 1.5 || 0.8 || 1.2 || 14.6
|-
| align="left" |  2017–18
| align="left" | Chiba
|60  || 59 ||29.0  || 60.9 ||25.7  || 64.4 || 7.7 || 2.8 ||0.9  ||1.2  || 18.1
|}

Personal

Edwards and his wife, Elle, have a son and daughter. His wife and children live in Arizona while he lives in Funabashi. He is a naturalized Japanese citizen, which allowed him to compete in the 2020 Tokyo Olympics.

His father, Earl Edwards is a former American football player.

References

1988 births
Living people
Japanese men's basketball players
American men's basketball players
American emigrants to Japan
Anyang KGC players
Basketball players at the 2020 Summer Olympics
Basketball players from Arizona
BC Khimik players
Chiba Jets Funabashi players
Olympic basketball players of Japan
Peristeri B.C. players
SeaHorses Mikawa players
Springfield Armor players
UConn Huskies men's basketball players
Kuala Lumpur Dragons players
Centers (basketball)
Power forwards (basketball)
American expatriate basketball people in Greece
American expatriate basketball people in Japan
American expatriate basketball people in Malaysia
American expatriate basketball people in Ukraine